Claire Patricia Grogan (born 17 March 1962), known professionally as Clare Grogan or sometimes as C. P. Grogan, is a Scottish actress and singer. She is best known as the lead singer of the 1980s new wave music group Altered Images, as well as for supporting roles in the 1981 film Gregory's Girl and the science fiction sitcom Red Dwarf, as the first incarnation of Kristine Kochanski.

Early life
Born in Glasgow, Grogan and her two sisters all attended the Notre Dame Convent School.

Aged 17, while she was dancing at the Glasgow College of Technology, a fight broke out nearby between several patrons. Grogan attempted to head away from the violence but was injured by thrown broken glass, causing a deep facial wound and a prominent scar on the left side of her face. Grogan states her parents still find it hard to read about the incident. She began filming Gregory's Girl just three months after the incident. In 1998, while she was working in theatre at Watford, it was discovered part of the glass was still in the facial tissue and had to be surgically removed.

Acting career

Theatre
As a member of Scottish Youth Theatre, she was originally obliged to appear as "C. P. Grogan" because there was already a member of Equity named Claire Grogan (the other Claire Grogan went on to become a photographer). She would later drop the i from her first name.

Grogan played the part of Rita in Educating Rita at Dundee Repertory Theatre in 1987.

In 1996 she played a fitness instructor on the Edinburgh Fringe in the play Lady Macbeth Firmed My Buttocks.

Film and television
While working as a waitress at the Spaghetti Factory restaurant in Glasgow, she was spotted by film director Bill Forsyth. This led to her breakthrough acting role in 1981's Gregory's Girl as Susan. Because of her facial wound there were objections from the producers, but Forsyth refused to recast the role and Grogan was filmed mostly in profile. When filmed in close up, makeup artists covered Grogan's scar with Derma wax.

In 1984, she played Charlotte in Forsyth's Comfort and Joy. In 1985, she was the receptionist in the BBC Television version of Blott on the Landscape. Grogan appeared in the second episode of the acclaimed The Monocled Mutineer in 1986. She had a recurring role playing Dave Lister's would-be love-interest, Kristine Kochanski, in series 1, 2 and 6 of the TV show Red Dwarf. However she was deemed too old for the role by Series 7 – despite being younger than most of her male counterparts – and replaced by Chloë Annett. Grogan has also appeared in Father Ted (episode "Rock-a-Hula Ted") in a thinly veiled parody of Sinéad O'Connor and in EastEnders as Ian Beale's love interest, Ros Thorne (1997–1998).

In 1992, Grogan appeared as Mary Catto in series 8 episode 21 of Taggart (again credited as C.P. Grogan).

She had the role of Maggie in a 1998 comedy Jilting Joe, played an Eye-Surgeon in a 2002 short film Bury It, appeared in Doctors in 2003, and performed another Edinburgh Fringe play Forbidden in 2004, as Lily, married to a WW2 Nazi officer but falling in love with a young Jewish woman.

In 2006 Grogan portrayed Sandra Reeves, a control-freak office manager, in the film The Penalty King played Cathy in an episode of Sea of Souls, and May, Danny's mother, in the Scottish sit-com Legit. She appeared in the video for Peter Kay and Matt Lucas' charity single "I'm Gonna Be (500 Miles)", recorded for Comic Relief's Red Nose Day 2007, along with two TV films Wedding Belles and Forgiven.

Grogan had a role in the 2011 TV series Skins as Shelley, mother of Mini McGuinness and played Jenny Ferris in the Scottish gangster film The Wee Man in 2013. 

She starred as Myriam in the 2017 film Delirium, filmed entirely at Royal Holloway, University of London.

Grogan co-presented, alongside Gary Maclean, BBC Scotland's Corner Shop Cook-Off. The six episode series originally aired from 19 February to 25 March 2020.

Music career
Grogan developed her singing career as the lead singer of Altered Images, originally a five-piece band that included Johnny McElhone (later of the Scottish rock band Texas), whom she met while studying for her Highers exams. It became a four-person band with the departure of two members and the addition of Stephen Lironi, who played both guitar and drums. The band had several hits in the early 1980s, including "Happy Birthday", "Don't Talk to Me About Love", "I Could Be Happy" and "See Those Eyes". The group split up after the release of their third album, Bite (1983).

In 1984, Grogan made a cameo appearance in the music video to "Young at Heart" by The Bluebells.

Grogan later attempted a solo career, but after her single "Love Bomb" failed to gain chart success in 1987, her album Trash Mad was never released. Grogan formed Universal Love School in 1989 with Lironi, performing a series of gigs around the UK. However, it was short-lived and produced no hit singles. In 2000, she contributed vocals to the song "Night Falls Like a Grand Piano" on The 6ths' album Hyacinths and Thistles. She recorded a version of "Angels with Dirty Faces" for the Frankie Miller tribute album. The track "Her Hooped Dream" appears on The Ultimate Celtic Album.

In 2002, Grogan performed as 'Altered Images' on the Here and Now Tour which featured other well known artists from the 1980s. She performed on similar tours in 2005, 2008 and 2009. She appeared with Chesney Hawkes, Toyah Willcox and Limahl as 'The 80s Supergroup' in the 2011 series of Let's Dance for Comic Relief.

Grogan sometimes covers for radio presenters on BBC 6 Music.

Grogan appeared in Series 2, Episode 2 of John Shuttleworth's Lounge Music on BBC Radio 4 on 27 November 2016.

Clare Grogan is the inspiration for the song "True" by Spandau Ballet.

Grogan began presenting shows on Absolute Radio 80s from 11 September 2017, presenting Monday to Thursday 8-9pm and Sundays 7-9pm.

In 2021, Grogan duetted with Sharleen Spiteri on the track "Look What You’ve Done", from Hi, the tenth album released by Johnny McElhone's band Texas.

Writing
Grogan's first book was published in October 2008, a children's novel (aimed at age 7 and up) titled Tallulah and the Teenstars, about a girl, Tallulah Gosh, who forms a pop band.

In 2015, it was followed by Tallulah On Tour.

Tallulah Gosh was an alias Grogan thought of using at the start of her career because Equity had already registered a Claire Grogan and a more showbiz name might help her career, but Bill Forsyth persuaded her that she would come to regret it.

The band Tallulah Gosh took their name from the headline of an interview with Grogan in NME.

Personal life
Grogan married bandmate Stephen Lironi in Glasgow in 1994. The couple live in Haringey in north London, and in 2005 they adopted a daughter, Ellie.

References

External links

 
 
 
 
 
Two interviews re early career 
BAAF patrons

1962 births
Living people
Scottish people of Irish descent
Women new wave singers
Actresses from Glasgow
Scottish film actresses
Scottish television actresses
Scottish new wave musicians
Scottish songwriters
People educated at Notre Dame High School, Glasgow
Musicians from Glasgow
20th-century Scottish women singers